Norman Robson (31 July 1907 – 1983) was an English professional footballer who played as a forward.

Career
Born in Ryton, Robson spent his early career with West Stanley, Preston North End and Derby County. He joined Bradford City in March 1933, scoring 9 goals in 20 league games for the club. He left the club in 1934 to join Wigan Athletic, where he scored 44 goals in 69 Cheshire League appearances. He joined Lancaster City in 1937, before returning to Wigan in February 1938, scoring a further two goals in seven league appearances.

Sources

References

1907 births
1983 deaths
People from Ryton, Tyne and Wear
Footballers from Tyne and Wear
English footballers
Association football forwards
West Stanley F.C. players
Preston North End F.C. players
Derby County F.C. players
Bradford City A.F.C. players
Wigan Athletic F.C. players
Lancaster City F.C. players
English Football League players